The August 2020 Scottish Conservative Party leadership election was the fifth internal party election to elect the next leader of the Scottish Conservatives, part of the British Conservative Party and the second-largest political party in the devolved Scottish Parliament.

Douglas Ross was announced as Leader on 5 August 2020 after running unopposed.

Background 
On 30 July 2020, Jackson Carlaw resigned as leader of the Scottish Conservatives after he said that he wasn't the right person to lead Scotland's voice in the union. At the time, support for Scottish independence was rising and the SNP had a substantial lead in the polls ahead of the upcoming Scottish Parliament elections in 2021.

The previous leader of the Scottish Conservatives, Ruth Davidson, agreed to represent the party at First Minister's Questions until a replacement leader was chosen, and until the 2021 Scottish Parliament election if the new leader was not a current MSP, at which point she would stand down to take up her seat in the House of Lords.

Campaign 
Douglas Ross, the Member of Parliament (MP) for Moray confirmed his intention to run for the leadership on 31 July. He was immediately endorsed by Ruth Davidson, a former leader of the Scottish Conservatives, and the former Scottish Secretary David Mundell. Ross also said he intended to stand as a Member of the Scottish Parliament (MSP) on the Highlands and Islands regional list if elected, while continuing to represent Moray in Westminster. Carlaw said that Ross's election should not be contested.

Candidates

Timeline 

 30 July: Jackson Carlaw resigns as leader of the Scottish Conservatives.
 31 July: Douglas Ross declares his intention to stand as leader.
 5 August: Nominations close, Douglas Ross is declared leader as no other candidates declared.

Endorsements

Douglas Ross 

MSPs

 Jackson Carlaw, former leader of the Scottish Conservatives, MSP for Eastwood
 Ruth Davidson, former leader of the Scottish Conservatives, MSP for Edinburgh Central
 Michelle Ballantyne, MSP for South Scotland
 Adam Tomkins, MSP for Glasgow
 Annie Wells, MSP for Glasgow
 Alison Harris, MSP for Central Scotland
 Maurice Golden, MSP for West Scotland
 Gordon Lindhurst, MSP for Lothian
 Oliver Mundell, MSP for Dumfriesshire
 John Scott, MSP for Ayr
 Brian Whittle, MSP for South Scotland
 Margaret Mitchell, MSP for Central Scotland

MPs
 Andrew Bowie MP for West Aberdeenshire and Kincardine
 John Lamont, MP for Berwickshire, Roxburgh and Selkirk
 David Duguid, MP for Banff and Buchan

See also 
February 2020 Scottish Conservative Party leadership election
2021 Scottish Parliament election

References 

Scottish Conservative Party leadership elections
2020 elections in the United Kingdom
August 2020 events in the United Kingdom
2020 in Scotland
2020s elections in Scotland
Scottish Conservatives leadership election